The Davenport family is first recorded in pipe rolls dating before 1254. Roger de Davenport, Lord of Davenport held the hereditary office of  Master Serjeant of the Peace for Macclesfield, Cheshire, England in the 1250s. Their residence was at Woodford and then at Capesthorne Hall, Macclesfield, which they still own.

Bromley-Davenport is the name of:
Arthur Bromley-Davenport (1867–1946), also known as A. Bromley Davenport, actor
Harry Bromley Davenport (born 1950), filmmaker
Hugh Bromley-Davenport (1870–1954), cricketer
Nicholas Walter Bromley-Davenport (born 1964), High Sheriff of Cheshire 2007–08
Sir Walter Bromley-Davenport (1903–1989), politician
William Bromley-Davenport, several individuals

External links
The lineage of the Bromley Davenports
Bromley Davenport Muniments. The National Archives. John Rylands Library, Manchester University.

English-language surnames
Compound surnames